John Ashley Syptak (born March 16, 1984) is a former American football defensive lineman who played for the Colorado Crush of the Arena Football League, the San Francisco 49ers and the New Orleans Saints of the National Football League.

High school years

Syptak attended Bellville High School in Bellville, Texas. He was a good student, a standout in football and baseball, and a member of the National Honor Society, Latin Club, Boy's State, and the Fellowship of Christian Athletes. He won Bellville's Citizenship Award. 

In football, he was a two-time team captain, and as a junior, he was named his team's Most Valuable Defensive Lineman. As a senior, he was named as a first-team All-Tri County selection, named the Austin County Defensive Player of the Year, and selected as the District 25-3A Defensive Player of the Year. 

In baseball, he was a four-year letterman, a four-time Academic All-District selection, and as a junior, he was an All-District selection. 

Syptak graduated in 2002 as the valedictorian of his graduating class.

References 

1984 births
Living people
People from Houston
American football defensive ends
Rice Owls football players
San Francisco 49ers players
Colorado Crush players
Frankfurt Galaxy players
Calgary Stampeders players